The Atlantic Coast Conference Men's Basketball Player of the Year is a basketball award given to the men's basketball player in the Atlantic Coast Conference (ACC) voted as the most outstanding player. It has been presented since the league's first season, 1953–54, by the Atlantic Coast Sports Media Association, and beginning in 2012–13 has also been presented in separate voting by the league's head coaches. The award was first given to Dickie Hemric of Wake Forest, and the coaches' award was first presented in 2013 to Shane Larkin of Miami.

Two players have won the award three times: David Thompson of North Carolina State and Ralph Sampson of Virginia. Hemric, Len Chappell, Larry Miller, John Roche, Len Bias, Danny Ferry, Tim Duncan and JJ Redick have won the award twice. There have been two ties in the award's history, which occurred at the end of the 2000–01 and 2012–13 seasons: In 2000–01 Joseph Forte of North Carolina and Shane Battier of Duke shared the award; and Erick Green of Virginia Tech and Larkin shared honors in 2012–13. Green and Larkin split the honor in the first year that the ACC began voting for players of the year by the conference's coaches and media separately (the media chose Green while the coaches chose Larkin).

Sixteen players have received either the Naismith or Wooden National Player of the Year awards in the same season that they received an ACC Player of the Year award. Duke's Zion Williamson is the most recent player to achieve this (2019). Each of the original 1953 ACC members has had at least one of its players win the award. Five ACC members have not had a winner: Florida State, Louisville, Notre Dame, Pittsburgh, and Syracuse. However, of these schools, only Florida State joined the ACC before 2013.

Key

Winners

Winners by school

Footnotes
This does not include any National Player of the Year awards before 1969, such as the Helms Foundation Player of the Year award. Present-day discussions of National Players of the Year preclude the pre-1969 basketball era.
The "Class" column refers to United States terminology indicating that student's year of athletic eligibility, which usually (but not always) corresponds to the year of study. For example, a freshman is in his first year (of four) of eligibility, followed by sophomore, junior and senior.
Charlie Davis was the first African American player to receive this award.
The University of Maryland left the ACC to join the Big Ten in 2014.
The University of South Carolina left the ACC in 1971.

See also
Atlantic Coast Conference Men's Basketball Coach of the Year
List of All-Atlantic Coast Conference men's basketball teams

References
General
  Click on the PDF link labeled "Pages 133–152" to access the guide pages with the list of winners.

Specific

NCAA Division I men's basketball conference players of the year
Player of the Year
Awards established in 1954